The Fiat CR.20 was an Italian biplane fighter used during the 1920s and 1930s. Designed by Celestino Rosatelli, it represented an intermediate step from the early biplane CR.1 and the later, successful series CR.30, CR.32 and CR.42.

Design and development
For the new aircraft, Rosatelli used a traditional sesquiplane configuration. The engine was a water-cooled  Fiat A.20 V-12 engine.

Major variants were the CR.20 Idro, a pontoon floatplane, and the CR.20 Asso, using a more powerful (336 kW/450 hp) Isotta Fraschini engine. CR.20bis, produced from 1930, differed from the original version only with the addition of a more advanced landing gear.

At its peak in 1933, the CR.20 equipped 27 squadrons of the Italian Regia Aeronautica.  The aircraft was used against Libyan rebels and in the early stages of the Second Italo-Abyssinian War in the attack role. The CR.20s remained in service with the Regia Aeronautica in the aerobatics and training until the 1930s. In 1933, Italy sold five CR.20s to Paraguay, which was fighting the Chaco War against Bolivia, these serving as Paraguay's only fighters through to the end of the war.

Variants

 CR.20 Idro : Twin-float seaplane version.
 CR.20bis : Single-seat fighter biplane, fitted with an advanced landing gear.
 CR.20bisAQ : CR.20bis aircraft fitted with the Fiat A.20 A.Q. piston-engine.
 CR.20 Asso : Single-seat fighter biplane, powered by a 336 kW (450 hp) Isotta Fraschini Asso Caccia engine.
 CR.20B : Two-seat trainer, communications aircraft. Built in small numbers.

Operators

Austrian Air Force (1931-1938)

Hungarian Air Force

Regia Aeronautica
Aviazione Legionaria
 Lithuania
Lithuanian Air Force - 15 units, 1928-1940.

Paraguayan Air Arm

Polish Air Force

Spanish Air Force

Soviet Air Force - Two aircraft, used for tests and trials.

Specifications (CR.20)

See also

References

Notes

Bibliography

 Angelucci, Enzo. The Rand McNally Encyclopedia of Military Aircraft, 1914-1980. San Diego, California: The Military Press, 1983. .
 Green, William and Gordon Swanborough. The Complete Book of Fighters. New York:Smithmark, 1994. .
 von Rauch, Gerd. "The Green Hell Air War". Air Enthusiast Quarterly, Number Two, 1976, pp. 207–213. Bromley, UK:Pilot Press. 
 Taylor, Michael J.H. Warplanes of the World 1918-1939. London: Ian Allan, 1981. .

CR.20
1920s Italian fighter aircraft
Single-engined tractor aircraft
Biplanes